Notocrinidae is a monotypic family of crinoids, the only genus being Notocrinus, which contains two species, both endemic to the seas around Antarctica.

Description
Members of this family have five arms which subdivide near the base giving them ten arms in total. The arms can reach  in length, and there are  thirty to sixty or more cirri. The gonads are located on the arms, and the embryos are brooded in cavities in the arms. The aboral surface (underside) of the disc has five deep radial pits arranged in a star-shape.

Species
The World Register of Marine Species lists the following species in this genus:

 Notocrinus mortenseni  John, 1938
 Notocrinus virilis  Mortensen, 1917

References

Comatulida
Echinoderm families